The discography of the progressive rock band Focus consists of 11 studio albums, 1 compilation album, 6 live albums, and 8 singles.

Studio albums

Compilation albums

Live albums

Singles

References

External links
 

Discographies of Dutch artists
Rock music group discographies
Pop music group discographies